Gyrinulopsis nanus is an extinct species of fossil beetle from the Ciechocinek Formation of the Lower Toarcian of Germany in the family Gyrinidae, the only species in the genus Gyrinulopsis.

References

Gyrinidae
Fossil taxa described in 1906